Tulare is a village in Serbia. It is located in the Medveđa municipality, in the Jablanica District. According to the 2011 census, Tulare had 161 inhabitants, mostly Serbs.

References
 Popis stanovništva, domaćinstava i Stanova 2002. Knjiga 1: Nacionalna ili etnička pripadnost po naseljima. Republika Srbija, Republički zavod za statistiku Beograd 2003. 

Populated places in Jablanica District